
Year 4 BC was a common year starting on Tuesday or Wednesday (link will display the full calendar) of the Julian calendar (the sources differ, see leap year error for further information) and a common year starting on Monday of the Proleptic Julian calendar. At the time, it was known as the Year of the Consulship of Sabinus and Rufus (or, less frequently, year 750 Ab urbe condita). The denomination 4 BC for this year has been used since the early medieval period, when the Anno Domini calendar era became the prevalent method in Europe for naming years.

Events

By place

Roman Empire 
 c. March – Upon the death of Herod the Great, there is unrest in his client kingdom of Judea. His son, Herod Archelaus, becomes the new ruler. Herod Antipas becomes tetrarch of Galilee and Perea. The Governor of Syria, Publius Quintilius Varus, assembles three of his four legions, including Legio X Fretensis, and marches down to Jerusalem from Antioch to restore order. He crucifies 2,000 Jewish rebels.

Asia 
 c. October – The Naikū of Ise Grand Shrine is founded in Japan, according to chapter 6 of Nihon Shoki.
 Namhae becomes king of the Korean kingdom of Silla.

Births 
 c. Possible months being June or October (due to convergence of Jupiter and Saturn forming the star of Bethlehem at his birth) – Jesus, Son of God who becomes the central figure of messianic Israelites and Christianity (d. AD 30 or AD 33). 
 Approximate date – Seneca the Younger, Córdoban-born Roman Stoic philosopher, statesman and dramatist (d. AD 65)

Deaths 
 March or April – Herod the Great, king of Judea (b. 73 BC)
 Antipater, Jewish heir and son of Herod the Great
 Malthace, Jewish woman and wife of Herod the Great
 Marcus Porcius Latro, Roman rhetorician 
 Marcus Tullius Tiro, Roman writer, freedman of Cicero

References